William Moore (March 3, 1893 – November 22, 1951) was an American blues singer and guitarist.

Moore was born in Dover, Georgia, and was raised in Tappahannock, Virginia. By 1917 he was working as a barber at South Amboy, New Jersey.

Described as "a facile, brilliant, and unusual guitarist", his style bridged ragtime and blues.  He was the only Virginian country bluesman to record for Paramount Records, cutting sixteen sides for the label in 1928 in Chicago. His four 78-rpm records are sought by collectors and have been reissued on numerous LP and CD compilation albums. His songs (e.g., "Ragtime Millionaire", "Old Country Rock", "One Way Gal") have been covered by Lightnin' Wells, John Fahey, Stefan Grossman and Duck Baker, the Insect Trust and The Notting Hillbillies.

He died in Warrenton, Virginia.

References

External links
 Fan Page of Bill "The Barber" Moore

1893 births
1951 deaths
American blues guitarists
American male guitarists
American blues singers
20th-century American guitarists
People from Screven County, Georgia
People from Tappahannock, Virginia
African-American guitarists
20th-century African-American male singers